Glissando is a 1982 Romanian drama film directed by Mircea Daneliuc. The film was selected as the Romanian entry for the Best Foreign Language Film at the 57th Academy Awards, but was not accepted as a nominee.

Cast
 Stefan Iordache
 Tora Vasilescu
 Petre Simionescu
 Victor Ionescu
 Ion Fiscuteanu
 Constantin Dinulescu
 Camelia Zorlescu
 Mihaela Nestorescu
 Rodica Moianu

See also
 List of submissions to the 57th Academy Awards for Best Foreign Language Film
 List of Romanian submissions for the Academy Award for Best Foreign Language Film

References

External links
 

1982 films
1982 drama films
1980s fantasy drama films
1980s Romanian-language films
Films directed by Mircea Daneliuc
Romanian fantasy drama films